Wu Yufan (born 3 November 1994) is a Chinese footballer currently playing as a forward for Kunshan.

Club career
Wu Yufan would play for the Hebei China Fortune reserve team before leaving to join third tier club Qingdao Jonoon in the 2017 China League Two campaign. After a season he moved to third tier club Suzhou Dongwu on 9 March 2018 and was part of the team that gained promotion to the second tier at the end of the 2019 China League Two campaign. On 22 July 2020 he would join second tier club Kunshan. He would go on to establish himself as regular within the team and was part of the squad that won the division and promotion to the top tier at the end of the 2022 China League One campaign.

Career statistics
.

Honours

Club 
Kunshan
 China League One: 2022

References

External links
Wu Yufan at Worldfootball.net

1994 births
Living people
Chinese footballers
Association football forwards
China League Two players
China League One players
Hebei F.C. players
Suzhou Dongwu F.C. players
Kunshan F.C. players